Endless Caverns is a commercial show cave located  south of New Market, Virginia, United States. The cave is a limestone solution cave.

History 
According to the tour operators, the cave was discovered by two boys in October 1879, while hunting rabbits on the property of Ruben Zirkle. The boys cornered a rabbit behind an outcropping of limestone rocks, and began moving some of the loose stones to flush the rabbit from his hiding place. After doing this they discovered a hole in the ground and ran back to the house to grab some ropes and candles. After going into the hole the boys found that there were many chambers and rooms. Not long after the discovery, the Zirkles began doing candle lit tours through the cave. In 1919, the cave was bought by Colonel Brown who had the cave fully electrified for the August 1920 grand opening with a lighting design by Phineas Stephens. In 1928 more electric work was done in collaboration with Samuel Hibben and W.A. Oglesby. There is a campground site with hookups for recreational vehicles at Endless Caverns.

Wildlife 

Endless is home to colonies of bats, primarily little brown bats, that are visible on the tour route.

Extent 

References

External links
 Endless Caverns website

Caves of Virginia
Show caves in the United States
Limestone caves
Landforms of Rockingham County, Virginia
Tourist attractions in Rockingham County, Virginia
1879 in science
1920 establishments in Virginia